The 2015–16 Vanderbilt Commodores women's basketball team will represent Vanderbilt University in the 2015–16 college basketball season. The team's head coach is Melanie Balcomb, in her fourteenth season at Vanderbilt. The team plays their home games at Memorial Gymnasium in Nashville, Tennessee, as a member of the Southeastern Conference. They finished the season 18–14, 5–11 in SEC play to finish in eleventh place. They advanced to the quarterfinals of the SEC women's tournament where they lost to Mississippi State.

On April 27, it was announced that Melanie Balcomb has resigned her position. She finished at Vanderbilt with a 14-year record of 310–149.

Roster

Schedule

|-
!colspan=12 style="background:#000000; color:#BDAE79;"| Exhibition

|-
!colspan=12 style="background:#000000; color:#BDAE79;"| Non-conference regular season

|-
!colspan=12 style="background:#000000; color:#BDAE79;"| SEC regular season

|-
!colspan=12 style="background:#000000; color:#BDAE79;"| SEC Women's Tournament

Rankings

References

See also
2015–16 Vanderbilt Commodores men's basketball team

Vanderbilt
Vanderbilt Commodores women's basketball seasons